Jill Ann Sterkel (born May 27, 1961) is an American former competition swimmer, Olympic champion, former world record-holder, and water polo player.  Sterkel won four medals in three Olympic Games spanning twelve years.  She was the women's head coach of the Texas Longhorns swimming and diving team at the University of Texas at Austin from 1992 to 2007.

Career
Sterkel was born in Hacienda Heights, California.  She graduated from Glen A. Wilson High School in Hacienda Heights.  She subsequently attended the University of Texas in Austin, Texas, where she swam for the Texas Longhorns swimming and diving team in Association for Intercollegiate Athletics for Women (AIAW) and National Collegiate Athletic Association (NCAA) competition from 1980 to 1983. As a senior in 1983, Sterkel won the NCAA national championships in 50-yard butterfly (24.26 seconds) and 100-yard butterfly (53.54 seconds). She won back-to-back Honda Sports Awards for Swimming and Diving, recognizing her as the outstanding college female swimmer of 1979–80 and 1980–81.

Sterkel represented the United States in three Summer Olympics.  As a 15-year-old at the 1976 Summer Olympics, she won a gold medal as a member of the winning U.S. team in the women's 4×100-meter freestyle relay, together with her teammates Kim Peyton, Wendy Boglioli and Shirley Babashoff.  After the U.S. women's team had been outshone in nearly every event by their East German rivals, Peyton, Boglioli, Sterkel and Babashoff achieved a moral victory by not only winning the relay gold medal, but also by breaking the East Germans' world record in the event final.  Individually, she competed in two other events, finishing seventh in the 100-meter freestyle and not advancing beyond the preliminary heats in the 200-meter freestyle.

Sterkel qualified again for the U.S. national team at the 1980 U.S. Olympic Trials, but because of the American-led boycott of the 1980 Summer Olympics, she was unable to participate at the 1980 games held in Moscow, Russia.

At the 1984 Summer Olympics in Los Angeles, she swam for the gold medal-winning U.S. team in the preliminary heats of the women's 4×100-meter freestyle. Starting at the 1984 games, relay swimmers who swam in the heats, but did not compete in the event finals, were eligible to receive medals.  As a 27-year-old at the 1988 Summer Olympics in Seoul, South Korea, she again swam for the U.S. team in the preliminary heats of the 4×100-meter freestyle relay, and earned a bronze medal for the team's third-place finish. She also competed individually in the 50-meter freestyle, tying for third and earning a bronze medal.

See also

 List of Olympic medalists in swimming (women)
 List of World Aquatics Championships medalists in swimming (women)
 List of World Aquatics Championships medalists in water polo
 World record progression 50 metres freestyle
 World record progression 4 × 100 metres freestyle relay
 List of University of Texas at Austin alumni
 Texas Longhorns

References

Bibliography 
 De George, Matthew,  Pooling Talent: Swimming's Greatest Teams, Rowman & Littlefield, Lanham, Maryland (2014). .

External links
 

1961 births
Living people
Sportspeople from Los Angeles
People from Hacienda Heights, California
American female freestyle swimmers
American female water polo players
World record setters in swimming
Swimmers at the 1976 Summer Olympics
Swimmers at the 1984 Summer Olympics
Swimmers at the 1988 Summer Olympics
Medalists at the 1976 Summer Olympics
Medalists at the 1984 Summer Olympics
Medalists at the 1988 Summer Olympics
Olympic gold medalists for the United States in swimming
Olympic bronze medalists for the United States in swimming
World Aquatics Championships medalists in swimming
World Aquatics Championships medalists in water polo
Swimmers at the 1975 Pan American Games
Swimmers at the 1979 Pan American Games
Swimmers at the 1983 Pan American Games
Pan American Games gold medalists for the United States
Pan American Games medalists in swimming
Medalists at the 1981 Summer Universiade
Universiade gold medalists for the United States
Universiade medalists in swimming
Texas Longhorns women's swimmers
Texas Longhorns swimming coaches
Medalists at the 1975 Pan American Games
Medalists at the 1979 Pan American Games
Medalists at the 1983 Pan American Games
Swimmers from Los Angeles